PM2FGK, branded as Prambors FM (formerly known as Prambors Rasisonia and 102,3 FMANIA) is a commercial contemporary hit radio based in Jakarta, Indonesia. Launched on March 18, 1971 in Jakarta, the purpose of station was to play pop music with their target audience being teenagers and young adults. Prambors is known as a teen icon in Indonesia throughout the 80's and 90's. It is owned and operated by Masima Radio Network (formerly Masima Contents + Channels). Prambors FM plays around all full Western Top 40 music. The radio station's officially tagline and slogan is "Indonesia's Number One Hit Music Station".

History
The station was founded by Imran Amir, Mursid Rustam, Malik Sjafei, Bambang Wahyudi, and Tri Tunggal. During the late 1960s, Prambors is the nickname one of the gangs from Menteng, in downtown Jakarta. Prambors is an abbreviation of Prambanan, Mendut, Borobudur, dan sekitarnya (Prambanan, Mendut, Borobudur and the surroundings), the name of several streets in Menteng, Central Jakarta. Starting from being amateur station, Prambors changed its name commercially due to government laws, with the name PT Radio Prambors. The radio network was officially opening to public on 18 March 1971 based in Jakarta and surrounding areas as Prambors Rasisonia — Rasisonia itself stands for Radio Siaran Sosial Niaga (Social Commercial Broadcast Radio).

Program
Prambors has had many creative programs throughout the years. Prambors started the careers of singers such as Chrisye because of their LCLR (Lomba Cipta Lagu Remaja) in 1977. In the 1980s, the Catatan Si Boy drama series was the Jakarta's favorite radio program. Due its success on the radio, CSB made the series in to a box office movie. Beside on-air programs, Prambors has off-air programs such as Prambors Nite and Tenda Mangkal  which are a crowd favorite.

Announcers
Prambors' radio DJs, or known as Wadyabala Prambors, has always been a young adult. It helps keep Prambors fresh, splashy and suited to young lifestyle. In the 1970s, Warkop Prambors was the radio's most successful announcer, and he became comedian and actor after his career at Prambors. In the 1980s, Prambors had Pepeng, Sys NS, Jimmy Gideon, Nana Krip, Krisna Purwana, Muthia Kasim and during 90s era the station had numerous well-known announcers such as Ferdy Hasan, Rebecca Tumewu, Fla Priscilla, Daddo Parus, Fajar Indroharyo, Vena Annisa who had very successful careers after Prambors as television presenters, MCs, and music label executive.

Stations 
Prambors broadcast in 9 Cities in Indonesia:

Jingles 
Previously Prambors Radio used the Jingles from JAM Productions as 102,3 FMania with jingles from Z100, and Reelworld used the Jingles from Prambors Radio from Z100. As Of 2013, Prambors no longer used the jingles, these replaced by Sweeper ID

Prambors jingles as 102,3 FMANIA Prambors Rasisonia (JAM Productions) 
 102,3 FM Prambors Jakarta
 Prambors Rasisonia Jakarta
 102,3 FMANIA Jakarta 
 102,3 FMANIA Information
 Today's Best Music, Prambors Radio
 Prambors Radio, The Station In Town
 All Day and To The Night, Prambors Radio

Prambors Jingles as Reelworld 
 Prambors Radio, Prambors

See also
 Indonesian popular music recordings

External links
http://www.pramborsfm.com
http://mrn.co.id

Indonesian radio networks
Radio stations in Jakarta
Radio stations established in 1971
1971 establishments in Indonesia